The Isaacs Fury is a British homebuilt sporting biplane designed by John Isaacs as a seven-tenths scale replica of the Hawker Fury fighter.

Development
Using the Currie Wot construction methods as a basis, John Isaacs designed a single-seat wood and fabric sporting biplane for homebuilders. It was a seven-tenths replica of the 1935 Hawker Fury biplane fighter. It was a single-bay biplane with a fixed tailskid landing gear and powered by a  Walter Mikron III piston engine in the nose with a two-bladed propeller. It has a single-seat open cockpit just aft of the wing. The prototype (G-ASCM) built by the designer between 1961 and 1963 at Southampton, England, first flew from Thruxton Aerodrome on 30 August 1963.

Between 1966 and 1967 the aircraft was re-engined with a  Lycoming O-290-D engine and first flown as the Fury Mk 2 in May 1967. The design was made available to amateur constructors.

The rights to plans for the design are held by the UK Light Aircraft Association.

Variants
Fury Mk 1
Prototype with a  Walter Mikron III piston engine.
Fury Mk 2
Prototype re-engined with a  Lycoming O-290-D piston engine for amateur construction.

Specifications (Fury Mk 2)

See also

References

Notes

Bibliography

External links

1960s British sport aircraft
Homebuilt aircraft
Replica aircraft
Single-engined tractor aircraft
Biplanes
Aircraft first flown in 1963